This is a list of airports in Egypt, grouped by type and sorted by location.



Airports

See also 
 Transport in Egypt
 List of airports by ICAO code: H#HE - Egypt
 Wikipedia: WikiProject Aviation/Airline destination lists: Africa#Egypt

Sources

References 

Airports
Airports
Egypt
Egypt